The United States Army Aviation Technology Office (ATO), known as Flight Concepts Division (FCD) before 2017, is a component of the United States Army that provides discreet, sometimes clandestine helicopter aviation support primarily to Joint Special Operations Command.  The unit provides highly specialized flights for special operations forces during covert and clandestine missions, and also has a bleeding-edge development role, leading research in emerging technologies for Army aviation. It is a part of the infrastructure of covert special operations airlift more secretive than the Army's 160th Special Operations Aviation Regiment, joining at least three other units across the services and within JSOC itself: the joint Aviation Tactics Evaluation Group (AvTEG), and the Air Force's 66th Air Operations Squadron and 427th Special Operations Squadron. Part of the U.S. Army Aviation Flight Test Directorate, the unit is located at Felker Army Airfield along the James River on Fort Eustis, and has been described as "the best of the very best" and "one of the most secretive U.S. military aviation units known to be in existence today."

History 
Little is known of the history of the unit because of its inherent secrecy, however it is often reported to have emerged out of the lineage of the unit known as SEASPRAY, as well as sharing connections with the former aviation component of Delta Force, Echo Squadron. Through its various incarnations, the unit's history has been described as "intertwined" with many other covert elements of the U.S. Army including the Intelligence Support Activity, as far back as the 1980's.

Activities 
The unit reportedly led the development of the stealth variant of the Sikorsky UH-60 Blackhawk helicopter used in the raid on Osama Bin Laden’s compound in Abbottabad, Pakistan.

Aircraft 

 
 Mil Mi-17
 
 Bell 407
 Hughes 530F
 
 Alenia C-27J Spartan

References 

Divisions of the United States Army

See also 

 SEASPRAY
 Scott A. Howell

United States Army aviation
Military units and formations in Virginia